Bass Strait Pidgin was an unattested English-based pidgin language spoken in the Bass Strait islands of Australia. It likely developed in the early 1800s as a result of contact between European sealers and Aboriginal women abducted from Tasmania.

References 

English-based pidgins and creoles of Australia
Bass Strait